Grant David Elliott (born 21 March 1979) is a former New Zealand cricketer, who played all formats of the game. Primarily a batting all-rounder, Elliott contributed a man of the match performance to provide entrance to New Zealand's first ever World Cup final, by beating South Africa in 2015. Domestically, he played for Wellington.

In March 2017, he announced his retirement from international cricket and in August 2018, he retired from all forms of cricket.

Early life 
The son of a South African plastic surgeon, Grant Elliott attended St Stithians College, whose notable cricketing alumni include Michael Lumb, Roy Pienaar, David Terbrugge, Dave Rundle and Kagiso Rabada.

South Africa 
He debuted with 67 in 1996–97 at Gauteng, where on the advice of his captain, former New Zealand test skipper Ken Rutherford, who saw  the quota system possibly blocking his path to higher honours, Elliott left his native Johannesburg for New Zealand in 2001. He played one match for South Africa 'A' against India 'A' before he qualified to play for New Zealand in 2007.

International career 
Called up to the national team in early 2008 during England's tour, he made his Test debut against England in the third test in Napier replacing  Jacob Oram.

Elliott has gone on to also make his ODI debut for New Zealand against England taking 3 wickets. In his second game he scored his maiden ODI 50. His maiden ODI century was in the 3rd game of the Chappell-Hadlee series scoring 115 against Australia at the SCG on Sunday 8 February 2009.

He also did well in the Champions trophy in South Africa in 2009 as he took a four wicket haul against England at the Wanderers which actually helped New Zealand to qualify for the semifinals and in the semifinals he played an innings  of 75 not out to take the Black caps to victory against Pakistan.

World records
Elliott scored his second ODI century when Sri Lanka toured New Zealand prior to the 2015 Cricket World Cup. Elliott and Luke Ronchi both broke several batting records as the pair lifted New Zealand from 93/5 to a commanding 360 off their 50 overs. Their stand of 267* is the highest 6th wicket partnership in ODIs.

In the inaugural Pakistan Super League in 2016 he along with Zulfiqar Babar set the highest 10th wicket partnership in any forms of T20 (63).

2015 World Cup
His finest moment however came  in the 2015 World Cup Semi final against South Africa where he scored an unbeaten 84 and was adjudged the Man of the Match. He hit the winning six off the second to last ball of the innings from Dale Steyn and created history by putting New Zealand into their first ever Cricket World Cup Final. In the final against Australia, Elliot top-scored for New Zealand, scoring 83 runs.

After the World Cup, Elliott was named in the Twenty20 side in 2016 after suffering an arm injury playing domestically for Wellington.

In April 2016, Elliott announced his retirement from ODI cricket.

In August 2017, he was named in a World XI side to play three Twenty20 International matches against Pakistan in the 2017 Independence Cup in Lahore.

Strengths 
Early on, Ken Rutherford noted his strong batting technique while also noting his occasional lack of self-belief. Former coach of the Wellington Firebirds, Anthony Stuart, commented that was "a tough cookie", and praised his commitment and high work ethic. Glenn Turner, former convener of the national selection panel, considered Elliott a "thoughtful character" whose  offside play was exceptional, such as his hallmark shot, the lofted drive over extra cover.

Other 
He played for Weybridge Cricket Club in the Surrey Championship in 2008.

Elliott is the maker of the Buzz Cricket Bat. It is used by himself, Dewayne Bowden, Mark Houghton, Leighton Morgan, Chris Nevin and Luke Woodcock. Luke Woodcock scored 220 with it in a first-class game. Since he has been injured he has worked with Sky Sport in the 2010 HRV Cup.

In 2015 Elliott worked part-time as a business development manager.

Now works full-time for cricHQ as a General Manager. He is also a cricket commentator for Spark Sports. His international shirt number has now passed to fellow ex-pat Black Cap - Devon Conway.

References

External links

 
 
 

Living people
1979 births
Cricketers from Johannesburg
South African cricketers
South African emigrants to New Zealand
Alumni of St Stithians College
New Zealand cricketers
New Zealand Test cricketers
New Zealand One Day International cricketers
New Zealand Twenty20 International cricketers
Cricketers at the 2015 Cricket World Cup
World XI Twenty20 International cricketers
Chattogram Challengers cricketers
Gauteng cricketers
Griqualand West cricketers
Lahore Qalandars cricketers
Leicestershire cricketers
North Island cricketers
Quetta Gladiators cricketers
Saint Lucia Kings cricketers
Surrey cricketers
Warwickshire cricketers
Wellington cricketers